Mikayıllı (also, Mikailly and Mikeyly) is a village and municipality in the Neftchala Rayon of Azerbaijan.  It has a population of 618. The municipality consists of the villages of Mikayıllı, Qızqayıtdı, Dalğalı (formerly Prorva), Kürdili, Sahiloba (formerly Saratovka), and Sarıqamış.

References 

Populated places in Neftchala District